Maccabi Hakoah Sydney City East FC, commonly known as Maccabi Hakoah, is an Australian semi-professional soccer club based in Sydney, New South Wales. The club was formed in 1939 as Sydney Hakoah by members of Sydney's Jewish community. They played between 1977 and 1986 in the National Soccer League as Eastern Suburbs (1977–1979) and Sydney City (1979–1987). One of the most successful sides in New South Wales and interstate competitions in the 1960s and early 1970s coached by the now retired Bob Szatmari, Hakoah were also one of the main instigators for the establishment of a national league. The club currently competes in the National Premier Leagues NSW, with games played from Hensley Athletic Field.

A foundation member of the NSL, Sydney City were also its most dominant side in the competition's first decade, winning four titles, including three in a row from 1980 to 1982, and finishing below third only once. However, despite this level of success, crowds were perennially low, and even though they were one of the sides retained for 1987, after the NSL scrapped the split conference system at the end of 1986, Sydney City withdrew from the NSL one round into the 1987 season.

History
In January of 1939 a group of Jewish immigrants, who had been playing soccer in Rushcutters Bay each Sunday met to discuss the formation of a soccer club. That meeting resulted in the birth of Sydney Hakoah Football Club. However, it was not until 1954 that Hakoah was admitted to the Southern League, a semi-professional regional league in New South Wales. The team played in distinctive blue and white striped shirts featuring the Magen David badge.

The club was admitted to the newly created first division of the New South Wales Soccer Federation following the breakaway of a number of clubs from the FIFA associated Soccer Association in 1956/57.

In 1977, the club's name was changed to Eastern Suburbs Hakoah. They were the winner of the first National League, known as the National Soccer League.

The club's name was again changed to Sydney City in 1978, and the home ground was moved from Wentworth Park to ES Marks Field in a successful year for the club. Eddie Thomson became coach in 1979, and together with manager Andrew Lederer led the club through its final years as Australia's most successful club.

The team included future International Jimmy Cant, Jim Patikas, striker Ken Boden and Australia's most successful goal scorer John Kosmina for the 1980 season. They went on to win the 1981, 1982 and 1983 NSL seasons with Australian International striker David Mitchell joining the star-studded club. In 1987 Sydney City withdrew mid-season as the most successful club in League history.

NSW State League return 
Since 1988 to the present, Sydney City have competed in the NSW State League North Conference in the NSW State Leagues. Recently, they have moved up through the New South Wales football ranks and have been promoted rapidly. In 2014 Hakoah were in NSW's 3rd division (State League 1) and won the Premiership and Grand Final Championship trophies which culminated in winning the Club Championship crown and gaining promotion to the (national premier leagues NSW2), eventually almost replicating that season in 2015, once again winning promotion, this time into the top tier in NSW. In 2012 they also won the double as State League Division Two Premiers and Grand Final Champions under the Hakoah FC banner playing out of Hensley Athletic Field.

They have been in the National Premier Leagues NSW since the 2016 season.

Current squad

First team squad

Seasons 

Notes

Honours

International
 OFC Cup Winners Cup 1987

National
 NSL Champions 1977, 1980, 1981, 1982
 NSL Runner Up 1978, 1983, 1985
 NSL Minor Premiers 1984 (Northern Division), 1985 (Northern Division)
 Australia Cup/NSL/FFA Cup Winners 1965, 1968, 1986
 Australian Club of the Decade (2) 1970s, 1980s

State
 New South Wales/NPL Minor Premiers 1968, 1970, 1971, 1973, 1974
 New South Wales/NPL Champions 1961, 1962, 1966, 1968
 New South Wales/NPL Runner Up 1973, 1974
 New South Wales Federation Cup & Waratah Cup Winners 1959, 1961, 1963, 1965, 1971, 1976, 2017
 Ampol Cup Winners 1957, 1968, 1973,
NSW State League/NSW League Two Premiers & Champions 2014
NSW Club Championship winners 2014, 2015
NSW State League Division Two/NSW League Three Champions 2012
NSW State League Division Two/NSW League Three Premiers 2012

See also
 1982 bombing of Hakoah Club

References

External links 
 

 
Jews and Judaism in New South Wales
Hakoah sport clubs
Jewish football clubs
Jews and Judaism in Sydney
National Soccer League (Australia) teams
City
Association football clubs established in 1939
1939 establishments in Australia
Diaspora sports clubs
Diaspora sports clubs in Australia